Hautenauve Jacqueline (born 11 July 1962) is a former Belgian heptathlete.

Born in Mons, Belgium, Jacqueline competed for her country at the 1988 Summer Olympics in Seoul, South Korea, where she finished twentieth in the heptathlon.

External links
Sports-reference.com

Belgian heptathletes
Athletes (track and field) at the 1988 Summer Olympics
Olympic athletes of Belgium
1962 births
Living people
Sportspeople from Mons